The Best of Hank Williams Jr. Volume One is a compilation album by country artist Hank Williams Jr. It was released in 1992 under Mercury Records.

Track listing
"Standing in the Shadows" (Williams) – 3:06
"Long Gone Lonesome Blues" (Hank Williams) – 2:36
"Cajun Baby" (Hank Williams, Williams) – 2:38
"Rock in My Shoe" (Williams) – 2:10
"It's All Over But The Crying" (Williams) – 2:35
"Nobody's Child" (Foree, Coben) – 2:48
"I Was with Red Foley" (Williams) – 2:48
"I Walked Out On Heaven" (Howard) – 2:31
"I'd Rather Be Gone" (Merle Haggard) – 2:40
"Eleven Roses" (McCall, Morris) – 2:40
"Cold Cold Ground" (Williams) – 2:29
"Hank" (Wayne) – 2:41
"Free Born Man" (Allison, Lindsay) – 2:51
"The Kind of Woman I Got" (Walls) – 3:01
"There's a Devil in the Bottle" (David) – 2:42
"Stoned at the Jukebox" (Williams) – 2:44
"Living Proof" (Williams) – 3:36
"Long Time Gone" (Betts) – 3:08
"Losing You" (Caldwell) – 3:34
"Can't You See" (Caldwell) – 4:38

1990 greatest hits albums
Hank Williams Jr. compilation albums
Mercury Records compilation albums